Anjana Menon is an Indian actress who predominantly appears in Malayalam films. She made her debut in the 2011 Malayalam film Traffic.

Early life
Anjana was born to P. N. Nirmala (mother) and K. P. Achuthan (father). She completed her high school education from Air Force School and went on to pursue her bachelor's degree and master's degree in Human Resources from Christ University, Bangalore. She briefly worked at The Times of India as an HR associate while she got to work on a couple of modelling campaigns.

Career
Her film career began when she got a call from director Rajesh Pillai for Traffic (2011) through the reference of a cameraman she was acquainted with. Along with films, she also did advertisement campaigns for several brands, such as Paul Alukkas, MIR Realtors, Dewa Builders, Malayala Manorama among others. Post Traffic, she got paired opposite Biju Menon in Sugeeth's 3 Dots and played the role of an independent widow named Grace.

Filmography

References

Living people
Indian film actresses
Actresses in Malayalam cinema
Actresses in Tamil cinema
Actresses from Kochi
21st-century Indian actresses
1988 births
People from Angamaly
Actresses in Kannada cinema
Actresses in Telugu cinema
Christ University alumni